Miss America 1996, the 69th Miss America pageant, was held at the Boardwalk Hall in Atlantic City, New Jersey on Saturday, September 16, 1995 and was televised by the NBC Network.

Results

Placements

Order of announcements

Top 10

Top 5

Awards

Preliminary awards

Quality of Life awards

Non-finalist awards

Other awards

Delegates

Judges
Kristian Alfonso
Kylene Barker
Barbara De Angelis
Jerry Orbach
Bruce Jenner
Holly Robinson
Vera Wang

References

External links
 Miss America official website

1996
1995 in the United States
1996 beauty pageants
1995 in New Jersey
September 1995 events in the United States
Events in Atlantic City, New Jersey